The Baltimore checkerspot (Euphydryas phaeton) is a North American butterfly of the family Nymphalidae.
It has been the official state insect of the U.S. State of Maryland since 1973. The Baltimore checkerspot was named for the first Lord Baltimore due to its similarity of colors in the family crest. Despite the species status as Maryland state insect, the population in Maryland has faced significant decline and is currently listed by the Maryland Department of Natural Resources as "rare, threatened, and endangered" animal list.

Life cycle
During its period of growth, the checkerspot butterfly will search for a host plant for nourishment. Its native larval host is the white turtle head (Chelone glabra), but it has also to some extent made use of the introduced lawn weed English plantain (Plantago lanceolata) and other plants.

Unlike most butterflies and moths, which overwinter as eggs, pupae, or sometimes adults, the Baltimore checkerspot overwinters as larvae.  In late summer (sometime in July through September depending on latitude, weather, and other factors) the larvae spin a pre-hibernation web on a plant, stop feeding, and remain in the web. Several months later they leave this web and enter the litter (dead grass and leaves and so on) on the ground, where they spend the winter.

References

External links
Baltimore Checkerspot, photos and information on Jeff's Nature Pages
Baltimore Checkerspot, Butterflies of Canada

Euphydryas
Butterflies of North America
Symbols of Maryland
Butterflies described in 1773
Taxa named by Dru Drury